Michael Green (born December 25, 1989) is an American soccer player.

External links
 New Mexico Lobos bio

1989 births
Living people
American soccer players
New Mexico Lobos men's soccer players
Pittsburgh Riverhounds SC players
People from Strongsville, Ohio
USL Championship players
United States men's under-20 international soccer players
Toronto FC draft picks
Association football midfielders